The 1998 Detroit Tigers finished in fifth place in their first season in the American League Central Division with a record of 65-97 (.401), 24 games behind the Cleveland Indians.  The Tigers were outscored by their opponents 863 to 722.  The Tigers drew 1,409,391 fans to Tiger Stadium in 1998, ranking 11th of the 14 teams in the American League.

The Tigers missed the playoffs for the 11th straight season, tying a record set between 1973–83. It was also the team's fifth consecutive losing season. Both streaks would last until 2006.

Offseason
November 11, 1997: Melvin Nieves was traded by the Detroit Tigers to the Cincinnati Reds for Paul Bako and Donne Wall.
November 18, 1997: Travis Fryman was traded by the Detroit Tigers to the Arizona Diamondbacks for Gabe Alvarez, Joe Randa, and Matt Drews (minors).
December 16, 1997: Billy Ripken was signed as a free agent with the Detroit Tigers.
December 22, 1997: Joe Oliver was signed as a free agent with the Detroit Tigers.
March 25, 1998: Doug Bochtler was purchased by the Detroit Tigers from the Oakland Athletics.

Regular season

Season standings

Record vs. opponents

Transactions
July 16, 1998: Joe Oliver was released by the Detroit Tigers.
July 20, 1998: Billy Ripken was released by the Detroit Tigers.

Roster

Player stats

Batting
Note: G = Games played; AB = At bats; H = Hits; Avg. = Batting average; HR = Home runs; RBI = Runs batted in

Note: pitchers' batting statistics not included

Starting pitchers
Note: G = Games pitched; IP = Innings pitched; W = Wins; L = Losses; ERA = Earned run average; SO = Strikeouts

Relief and other pitchers 
Note: G = Games pitched; IP = Innings pitched; W = Wins; L = Losses; SV = Saves; ERA = Earned run average; SO = Strikeouts

Farm system

LEAGUE CHAMPIONS: West Michigan

References

External links

1998 Detroit Tigers season at Baseball Reference

Detroit Tigers seasons
Detroit Tigers
Detroit
1998 in Detroit